Hanapepe or Hanapēpē is a historic, unincorporated community in Kauai County, Hawaii, United States. The name means "crushed bay" in Hawaiian, which may refer to landslides in the area. For statistical purposes, the United States Census Bureau has defined Hanapepe as a census-designated place (CDP). The population was 2,678 at the 2020 census, up from 2,153 at the 2000 census.

History

Hanapepe was one of the locations visited by the United States Exploring Expedition under Charles Wilkes; the expedition arrived in Hawaii in late September 1840 and spent some time in the islands.

It is one of the few towns on the island that was not created by the sugarcane plantations. In 1924, an armed labor dispute involving sugar workers occurred, ending in the Hanapepe massacre.

Geography
Hanapepe is located on the southern side of the island of Kauai. It is bordered to the east, across the Hanapēpē River and Hanapepe Bay, by the community of Eleele. Hawaii Route 50 passes through the southern part of Hanapepe, leading east  to Lihue and northwest  to Waimea.

For statistical purposes, the United States Census Bureau has defined Hanapepe as a census-designated place (CDP). The census definition of the area may not precisely correspond to local understanding of the area with the same name.

Demographics

As of the census of 2000, there were 2,153 people, 706 households, and 533 families residing in the CDP. The racial makeup of the CDP was 16.0% White, 0.1% African American, 0.3% Native American, 48.6% Asian, 8.5% Pacific Islander, 0.2% from other races, and 26.3% from two or more races. Hispanic or Latino of any race were 8.6% of the population.

There were 706 households, out of which 41.8% had children under the age of 18 living with them, 57.2% were married couples living together, 12.3% had a female householder with no husband present, and 24.4% were non-families. 19.8% of all households were made up of individuals, and 8.6% had someone living alone who was 65 years of age or older.  The average household size was 3.05 and the average family size was 3.54.

In the CDP the population was spread out, with 32.0% under the age of 18, 6.5% from 18 to 24, 29.4% from 25 to 44, 20.1% from 45 to 64, and 12.1% who were 65 years of age or older.  The median age was 35 years. For every 100 females, there were 103.3 males.  For every 100 females age 18 and over, there were 98.9 males.

The median income for a household in the CDP was $44,112, and the median income for a family was $50,750. Males had a median income of $30,039 versus $24,224 for females. The per capita income for the CDP was $17,043.  About 5.8% of families and 6.6% of the population were below the poverty line, including 7.7% of those under age 18 and 10.8% of those age 65 or over.

Economy
The main street has plantation-style buildings built in the 1930s and ’40s that house art galleries, eateries and boutiques. Hanapepe is the headquarters location for the ice cream company Lappert's Hawaii, as well as home to the westernmost bookstore in the United States, The Bookstore - Talk Story.

In popular culture
The town was the inspiration for Kokaua Town, the fictional hometown of the main characters in the Disney animated film Lilo & Stitch and its related franchise (the town was not named until Lilo & Stitch: The Series).

On August 27, 1980, Douglas Kenney, a co-writer of the film National Lampoon's Animal House, fell  to his death from the Hanapepe Lookout.

References

External links
hanapepe.org

Census-designated places in Kauai County, Hawaii
Populated places on Kauai
Populated coastal places in Hawaii